Newbern is an unincorporated community in Clifty Township, Bartholomew County, in the U.S. state of Indiana.

History
A post office was established at Newbern in 1833, and remained in operation until it was discontinued in 1901. Newbern was named after New Bern, North Carolina, the native home of an early settler.

Geography

References

Unincorporated communities in Bartholomew County, Indiana
Unincorporated communities in Indiana